Key-Sung Cho (born 1936 in Chang-Heung, South Korea) served in South Korea's foreign service for over 38 years and was the former South Korean Ambassador to Guatemala, Peru and Argentina.  Since retiring from the foreign service in 1999, Cho was a visiting scholar at the School of Advanced International Studies at the Johns Hopkins University and Georgetown University Law Center, as well as a Professor of International Law at the Ewha Womans University College of Law in Seoul, Korea and Chosun University in Kwangju, Korea.  Cho is currently the Chairman of the Medical Peace Foundation, a non-profit organization he founded which develops medical centers in impoverished parts of the world.  The foundation has developed more than 23 medical centers in Africa, Asia and Latin America.  Cho also served on the South Korean Olympic Committee responsible for bringing the 1988 Summer Olympics to Seoul, as well as the South Korean Olympic Committee which vied for the 2018 Winter Olympics. Cho received his Bachelor of Arts degree from Hankuk University for Foreign Studies, his Master of Laws degree from Chosun University and his Doctorate of Law from Mariano Galvez University of Guatemala.  Cho's wife is Kun-Hee, with whom he has two children, Helen and Mukang.  Helen is a Professor in the Anthropology Department at Davidson College and Mukang is the Chief Executive Officer and Managing Principal of Morning Calm Management, a real estate investment and management firm.

References 

1936 births
Ambassadors of South Korea to Argentina
Ambassadors of South Korea to Guatemala
Ambassadors of South Korea to Peru
Living people